The Ministry of Development (MoD) is a cabinet-level ministry in the government of Brunei which is responsible for public works, land use, environment, public housing and surveying. It was established immediately upon Brunei's independence on 1 January 1984. It is currently led by a minister, and the incumbent is Muhammad Juanda Abd. Rashid who took office since 7 June 2022. The ministry is headquartered in Bandar Seri Begawan.

Departments 
The ministry oversees the following departments:
 Department of Environment, Parks and Recreation (JASTRe) — responsible for waste management, public landscaping, recreational areas, and environmental conservation and policy
 Housing Development Department — manages public housing
 Lands Department — enforces land law, and administers land ownership
 Public Works Department (JKR) — manages public buildings, roads infrastructure, water services and sewerage
 Survey Department — oversees cadastral surveying, hydrography, administrative divisions, national boundary and calculation of Hijri calendar
 Department of Town and Country Planning — oversees urban planning

Budget 
In the 2022–23 fiscal year, the ministry has been allocated a budget of B$335 million, a 50 percent increase from the previous year.

Ministers

Notes

References

External links 
  

Development